The University of California Humanities Research Institute (UCHRI), is a humanities research institute at the University of California headquartered at the UC Irvine campus. It promotes collaboration and interdisciplinarity through supporting work by teams of researchers from varying fields both within and outside of the UC system. David Theo Goldberg, was appointed Director in 2000.

References

External links

Humanities Research Institute
University of California, Irvine
Humanities institutes